Assembly elections were held in Eritrea on 5 and 6 September 1956. All candidates ran as independents.

Background
Elections had previously been held in 1952 during the British administration. Following the elections, article 45 of the new Eritrean constitution required that the Legislative Assembly pass a new electoral law to replace the 1951 proclamation and establish an Electoral High Commission prior to the next elections. In 1953 the Assembly rejected a draft law, and the government obtained confirmation from the Attorney General that the 1951 proclamation would still be applicable.

However, this had not been done, and in the months leading up to the 1956 elections the Muslim League asked the Supreme Court to declare them unconstitutional.

Conduct
The Eritrean police force began harassing opponents of the Unionist Party government in September 1955 under the leadership of pro-Unionist Tedla Ogbit. The federal authorities also intervened to "frighten off any possible opposition", and one anti-Unionist candidate, Muhammed Omar Akito, had a bomb thrown into his living room.

However, the Supreme Court made some interventions on behalf of the opposition, demanding opposition candidate Fessha Woldermariam be released from police detainment after he was arrested a week before nominations closed. It also confirmed the victory of opposition candidate Muhammed Omar Akito, which the Assembly had declared invalid.

Results
A total of 188 candidates contested the 68 seats, with 32 Unionists and 24 opposition or non-aligned candidates elected.

Aftermath
The self-dissolution of the Assembly in 1962 was the pretext for annexation of Eritrea by Imperial Ethiopia.

References

1956
Parliamentary election
1956 elections in Africa
Non-partisan elections